Madison County is a county located in the U.S. state of North Carolina. As of the 2020 census, the population was 21,193. Its county seat is Marshall. Madison County is part of the Asheville, NC Metropolitan Statistical Area.

History
The county was formed in 1851 from parts of Buncombe County and Yancey County. It was named for James Madison, fourth President of the United States (1809–1817).

The commmunity of Long Ridge, outside of Mars Hill, is a traditionally African-American community, and boasts one of the last remaining Rosenwald Schools in Western North Carolina.

Geography

Madison County is located deep in the Appalachian Mountains of western North Carolina, and much of the county's terrain is rugged, heavily forested, and sparsely populated. The county's northern border is with the State of Tennessee. Madison County's largest river is the French Broad River, which flows north-northwest through the county, first past the county seat of Marshall, then past the resort town of Hot Springs.

National protected area 
 Great Smoky Mountains National Park (part)

State and local protected area 
 Harmon Den Wildlife Management Area (part)

Major water bodies 
 Big Laurel Creek
 French Broad River
 Gabriel Creek
 Ivy Creek
 Little Creek
 Little Laurel Creek
 Simmons Creek
 Whiteoak Creek

Adjacent counties
 Greene County, Tennessee - north
 Unicoi County, Tennessee - northeast
 Yancey County - east
 Buncombe County - south
 Haywood County - southwest
 Cocke County, Tennessee - northwest

Major highways

Demographics

2020 census

As of the 2020 United States census, there were 21,193 people, 8,403 households, and 5,456 families residing in the county.

2000 census
As of the census of 2000, there were 19,635 people, 8,000 households, and 5,592 families residing in the county. The population density was 44 people per square mile (17/km2). There were 9,722 housing units at an average density of 22 per square mile (8/km2). The racial makeup of the county was 97.63% White, 0.83% Black or African American, 0.27% Native American, 0.23% Asian, 0.01% Pacific Islander, 0.45% from other races, and 0.59% from two or more races. 1.35% of the population were Hispanic or Latino of any race.

There were 8,000 households, out of which 28.40% had children under the age of 18 living with them, 57.50% were married couples living together, 8.90% had a female householder with no husband present, and 30.10% were non-families. 26.30% of all households were made up of individuals, and 11.80% had someone living alone who was 65 years of age or older. The average household size was 2.34 and the average family size was 2.81.

In the county, the population was spread out, with 21.20% under the age of 18, 10.30% from 18 to 24, 26.50% from 25 to 44, 26.00% from 45 to 64, and 15.90% who were 65 years of age or older. The median age was 39 years. For every 100 females there were 97.30 males. For every 100 females age 18 and over, there were 93.30 males.

The median income for a household in the county was $30,985, and the median income for a family was $37,383. Males had a median income of $27,950 versus $22,678 for females. The per capita income for the county was $16,076. About 10.90% of families and 15.40% of the population were below the poverty line, including 17.60% of those under age 18 and 19.20% of those age 65 or over.

Law, government, and politics

Government
Madison County is governed by a five-member Board of Commissioners who are elected every two years with staggered four year terms as proscribed by North Carolina state law.. The Board selects its own chairman and holds scheduled meetings on the second Monday of each month. Madison County is a member of the Land-of-Sky Regional Council of governments.

Law and policing
The Madison County Sheriff's Office protects the court, manages the jail, protects county owned facilities, and provides patrol and detective services for the unincorporated areas of the county. The towns of Mars Hill, Hot Springs, and Marshall have municipal police departments.

Politics
Due to its Appalachian highland location, Unionist sympathies during the American Civil War, and rural character, Madison County has been a historically Republican county, even during the Solid South Democratic era. For a time the county turned competitive before again becoming strongly Republican – although as recently as 2008, Barack Obama came within two hundred votes of carrying the county. The county is notorious for political machines: the Ponder machine governed the county from the late 1950s to the 1990s, and before that a long-lived Republican machine had ruled the county and kept it in GOP hands between 1880 and 1956: it was one of five North Carolina counties to reject Franklin Roosevelt in all four of his campaigns, and one of only seven each to vote for Alf Landon in 1936 and for Wendell Willkie in 1940.

Madison is considered a "dry" county, meaning that the sale and/or public consumption of alcoholic beverages is illegal within the county limits.  However, individual towns have right of self-determination regarding alcohol sales, and Hot Springs, Marshall and Mars Hill all allow beer and wine sales, but not liquor.

Education
Madison County's public educational system consists of one early college high school, one traditional high school (Madison High School, located in the county seat of Marshall), one middle school (Madison Middle School), and three elementary schools (Brush Creek Elementary, Hot Springs Elementary, and Mars Hill Elementary).  Brush Creek Elementary was built as a merger of Marshall Elementary and Walnut Elementary after the latter burned down in 1998.

The county is also home to Mars Hill University, a private, coed, four-year liberal-arts university. Founded in 1856, Mars Hill is the oldest college or university in western North Carolina. The university offers 34 majors and seven degrees: Bachelor of Arts, Bachelor of Science, Bachelor of Science in Nursing (BSN), Bachelor of Music, Bachelor of Fine Arts, Bachelor of Social Work, and Master of Education.

Culture
Madison County was historically a center for old-time folk music.  Among others, the folk song Rain and Snow likely originated there, in the late 19th century.

Communities

Towns
 Hot Springs
 Mars Hill (largest town)
 Marshall (county seat)

Townships
The county is divided into eleven townships: Beech Glenn, Ebbs Chapel, Grapevine, Hot Springs, Laurel, Mars Hill, Marshall, Revere Rice Cove, Sandy Mush, Spring Creek and Walnut.

Formerly there were sixteen townships, which were both numbered and named:

 1 (Marshall)
 2 (Shelton Laurel)
 3 (Bull Creek)
 4 (Middle Fork of Ivy)
 5 (West Fork of Ivy)
 6 (Sandy Mush)
 7 (Little Pine Creek)
 8 (Spring Creek)
 9 (Hot Springs)
 10 (Big Laurel)
 11 (Upper Laurel)
 12 (Big Pine Creek)
 13 (Meadow Fork of Spring Creek)
 14 (Grapevine)
 15 (Mars Hill)
 16 (Foster Creek)

Unincorporated communities

 Barnard
 Faust
 Hurricane
 Joe
 Luck
 Paint Rock
 Petersburg
 Revere
 Spring Creek
 Trust
 Walnut
 White Rock

See also
 List of counties in North Carolina
 National Register of Historic Places listings in Madison County, North Carolina
 List of national forests of the United States

References

External links

 
 
 NCGenWeb Madison County - free genealogy resources for the county

 
Asheville metropolitan area
Counties of Appalachia
1851 establishments in North Carolina
Populated places established in 1851
Sundown towns in North Carolina